The Harris Cup is an ice hockey championship trophy, awarded annually to the NCAA Division III Northern Collegiate Hockey Association (NCHA) league playoff champion.

The trophy originated with the Midwest Collegiate Hockey Association.  The MCHA first awarded a championship trophy in 1998.  The trophy was renamed the Harris Cup in 2002 and first awarded under that name in 2003.  All previous winners of the MCHA trophy are inscribed on the trophy and recognized as Harris Cup awardees.  The trophy is named after Dan Harris, who served as MCHA league president through 2002 and is the long-serving athletics director for Milwaukee School of Engineering.  Following the MCHA and NCHA's merger in 2013, the trophy will be awarded to the NCHA's playoff champion beginning in 2014.

Winners

References

College ice hockey trophies and awards in the United States
Midwest Collegiate Hockey Association
Northern Collegiate Hockey Association